Emmanuel Rubayiza (born 29 October 1977) is a Rwandan sprinter. He competed in the men's 400 metres at the 1996 Summer Olympics.

References

1977 births
Living people
Athletes (track and field) at the 1996 Summer Olympics
Rwandan male sprinters
Olympic athletes of Rwanda
Place of birth missing (living people)